The Black Widow is a 1951 British thriller film directed by Vernon Sewell and starring Christine Norden and Robert Ayres.  The film was a B-movie production by Hammer Film Productions and was based on a radio serial entitled Return from Darkness.

Plot
Mark Sherwin (Ayres) is driving in the country when he notices a man lying at the side of the road.  Assuming the man is the victim of a hit-and-run, he stops to offer assistance, only to be coshed and left stunned while his wallet and car are stolen.  On recovering his senses, he staggers towards a nearby farmhouse where he collapses.  He is found by the farm owner, who summons a doctor.  Meanwhile, the car thief comes to grief while speeding round a corner on a clifftop road, the car plunges over the edge and explodes in flames.

Sherwin regains consciousness, but is suffering from complete amnesia with no idea of his own identity or how he came to be found in such a remote location.  The farm owner and his daughter agree to look after Sherwin while he recuperates.  The police investigate missing persons reports but find no case to match Sherwin's age and physical description.  Some days later Sherwin is on the mend, and happens to find in his overcoat pocket a ticket stub from a theatre in a town some 50 miles away.  Hoping to find some clue as to his identity, he takes a train to the town and walks the streets to see whether anything will jog his memory.

He comes across a house which he seems to recognise and walks in through the unlocked door.  Inside he finds a flower-covered coffin in the front room.  A woman (Norden) enters and on seeing Sherwin, screams and faints.  This jolts Sherwin's memory back into gear and he recognises the woman as his wife Christine, who has believed him dead since there was no reason for anybody to consider that the body found in the burned-out car was not his.

Sherwin is bothered by his wife's odd demeanour, particularly her excessive concern about whether or not anybody could have seen him in the street or arriving at the house.  His suspicions aroused, he decides to continue to play the amnesiac.  Saying he is going upstairs to rest, he eavesdrops on her telephone calls and soon realises that she is speaking to a lover of some time standing, the gist of the conversation being the need to dispose of Sherwin quickly before anyone else finds out that he was not the crash victim.  Gradually, he finds out that Christine and her lover (Anthony Forwood) had been intending to sell the house and cash all his assets, and his inconvenient reappearance has derailed their plans.  Aware now of Christine's true colours, he decides to play along with her schemes until he can engineer a suitable come-uppance for the pair.

Cast
 Christine Norden as Christine Sherwin
 Robert Ayres as Mark Sherwin
 Jennifer Jayne as Sheila Kemp
 Anthony Forwood as Paul Kenton
 John Longden as Mr. Kemp
 John Harvey as Dr. Wallace
 Reginald Dyson as Police Sergeant
 Joan Carol as Hotel Desk Clerk
 Madoline Thomas as Housekeeper
 Jill Hulbert as Helen

Critical reception
TV Guide noted the film as having "some exciting moments."

References

External links 
 
 
 

1951 films
1950s thriller films
British thriller films
Hammer Film Productions films
British black-and-white films
Films directed by Vernon Sewell
Films based on radio series
Films about amnesia
Adultery in films
1950s English-language films
1950s British films